There are two census-designated places in California named Lockwood:

 Lockwood, Amador County, California
 Lockwood, Monterey County, California

See also
 Lockwood Valley, California, incorporated area in Ventura County